"The Most Incredible Thing" is the final literary fairy tale by Danish poet and author Hans Christian Andersen (1805–1875). The story is about a contest to find the most incredible thing and the wondrous consequences when the winner is chosen.  The tale was first published in an English translation by Horace Scudder, an American correspondent of Andersen's, in the United States in September 1870 before being published in the original Danish in Denmark in October 1870. "The Most Incredible Thing" was the first of Andersen's tales to be published in Denmark during World War II. Andersen considered the tale one of his best.

Plot summary

When the tale begins, a contest has been proclaimed in which half the kingdom and the hand of the princess in marriage will be the rewards of he who can produce the most incredible thing. A poor young man creates a magnificent clock with different lifelike figures — Moses, Adam and Eve, the Four Seasons, the Five Senses, and others — which appear at the stroke of the hour. All agree the clock is the most incredible thing and its creator is named the winner.  Suddenly, another man smashes the clock and all then agree that this act is even more incredible than the creation of the beautiful clock.  The destroyer is to wed the princess, but at the wedding, the figures of the clock magically reappear, defeat him, and then vanish. All agree that this is the most incredible thing, and the princess and the young creator of the clock marry.

The figures
Each hour on the clock is represented by a figure from the Bible, mythology, folklore or common knowledge.

One o'clock: Moses, writing the first of the ten commandments
Two o'clock: Adam and Eve
Three o'clock: The Three Wise Men
Four o'clock: The Four Seasons, represented by a cuckoo bird (spring), a grasshopper (summer), an empty stork's nest (autumn), and an old crow (winter)
Five o'clock: The Five Senses, represented by a spectacle maker (sight), a coppersmith (hearing), a flower girl (smell), a cook (taste), and an undertaker (touch)
Six o'clock: A gambler, who always rolled sixes
Seven o'clock: The seven days of the week, or the seven deadly sins
Eight o'clock: A choir of eight singing monks
Nine o'clock: The Muses of Greek mythology
Ten o'clock: Moses returns with the rest of the Ten Commandments
Eleven o'clock: Eleven children played and sang "Two and two and seven, the clock has struck eleven"
Twelve o'clock: A night watchman announces the birth of Christ

Sources
The tale has no counterpart in traditional folk and fairy lore but is entirely original with Andersen.  Its inspiration is ascribed to Andersen's distress over the Franco-Prussian War and the wars between Denmark and Prussia in the 1860s.  Andersen had been warmly received in Germany and the poet loved German high culture but he was completely shocked by the nation's descent into militarism.  He was heartbroken with the realization that it would be necessary for him to sever ties with his German friends.

Publication history

The tale was first published as “The Most Extraordinary Thing” in an English translation by Horace Scudder in the United States in The Riverside Magazine for Young People in September 1870. The Danish original appeared in Denmark in the journal Nyt Dansk Maanedsskrift a month later in October 1870. The tale was reprinted in Denmark on 30 March 1872 and again on 20 December 1874 in collections of Andersen's tales.

Andersen enjoyed performing before an audience and promoted many of his tales by reading them aloud at social gatherings.  In the 1840s, the composer Felix Mendelssohn-Bartholdy was present at such a reading in Germany and reported he was so elated and excited by the performance that he couldn't wait to thank Andersen but "jubilantly flew" at the poet exclaiming: "But you are a marvelous reader; no one reads fairy tales like you!" Many years later in the 1870s, the English author and critic Edmund Gosse had a similar perception and noted, "As soon as he spoke, yes, if he merely smiled, he genius was evident ... And as he read, everything I was looking at—the dazzling sails, the sea, the coast of Sweden, the bright sky—was set ablaze as the sun went down. It was as if nature itself were blushing with delight at the sound of Hans Christian Andersen's voice."

Andersen managed to read aloud "The Most Incredible Thing" at least seven times within a matter of days.  The readings began before a circle of admirers at the home of the Koch family on the day the tale was finished. Over the next several days, he visited the homes of several others including the Hartmanns, the Collins, the Thieles, and the Melchiors.  Andersen used such readings to gauge the success of his compositions: the louder and longer the audience's applause, the fewer corrections he would make to the tale and the sooner the manuscript reached the publisher's office.

Commentaries
For fairy tale and folk lore researcher Maria Tatar, the tale summarizes Andersen's views on the "essence of art" with the clock representing both temporality and transcendence.  It keeps time but it is also a work of art that cannot be destroyed. She notes that the clock houses both "the biblical and the mythical, the seasons and the senses, the visual and the acoustical, the carnal and the spiritual" and thus brings together everything Andersen wanted in art.  The wondrous clock "mingles the secular with the sacred and the pagan with the Christian".  The beauty of the clock and its figurines defy and transcend destruction and continue to live in a way that humans cannot.

Cultural impact
"The Most Incredible Thing" was the first Andersen story published during the Nazi occupation of Denmark during World War II.  The introduction to the July 1940 edition suggested Andersen had written the tale in profound anxiety and doubt over the future that "was superseded with an even more profound faith."  In 1942, the tale was published in a volume of stories organized by scholars who would later become leaders of the Danish Resistance  Movement. In the tale's final illustration to the 1942 edition, the night watchman is a bearded rabbi who strikes down the brawny semi-naked Aryan destroyer of the clock while a crowd of Danes in contemporary 1940s dress stands by and watches.

Stage Adaptations

Pet Shop Boys Ballet

In 2011 British pop act Pet Shop Boys wrote the music for a ballet based on the story that opened in March 2011 at Sadler's Wells in London. The story was adapted by Matthew Dunster and featured choreography by Javier de Frutos. It starred former Royal Ballet principal Ivan Putrov and animated film created by Tal Rosner. The ballet won an Evening Standard Theatre Award and returned to Sadlers Wells for a second season in 2012.

In 2018 the Charlotte Ballet produced and presented the American premiere of the ballet created at Sadler's Wells.

Other productions

In 2016 the New York City Ballet premiered a one-act ballet based on the same story, choreographed by Justin Peck.

See also

 List of works by Hans Christian Andersen

References

External links

 "The Most Incredible Thing" English translation by Jean Hersholt
 Det Utroligste Original Danish text

1870 short stories
Danish fairy tales
Fictional objects
Clocks in fiction
Short stories by Hans Christian Andersen